The Great Bahama Canyon is a V-shaped submarine canyon system in the Bahamas that cuts between the Abaco Islands to the north and Eleuthera island to the south. It separates the Bahama Banks and forms one of the deepest underwater canyon systems known. There are three branches: the Tongue of the Ocean running south between Andros and New Providence, and the northeast and northwest Providence Channel. This canyon system has remained open through a process of submarine erosion.

References

Submarine canyons of the Atlantic Ocean